was a Japanese writer in the early Shōwa period known for his poetic short stories. His poetic works were praised by fellow writers including Yasunari Kawabata and Yukio Mishima. Today his works are admired for their finely tuned self-observation and descriptive power.

Despite the limited body of work he created during his short lifetime, Kajii has managed to leave a lasting footprint on Japanese culture. "Lemon" is a staple of literature textbooks. According to a report in major daily newspaper Asahi Shimbun, many high school students have emulated the protagonist's defiant act of leaving a lemon in the book section of Maruzen, a department store chain. The opening line of "Under the Cherry Trees" (Dead bodies are buried under the cherry trees!) is popularly quoted in reference to hanami, the Japanese custom of cherry blossom viewing.

Biography

Childhood and education (1901–1924)
Kajii was born in Osaka in 1901. He attended primary school in Tokyo from 1910 to 1911, middle school in Toba from 1911 to 1913, and Osaka Prefectural Kitano High School from 1914 to 1919. In September 1919, Kajii entered Kyoto's Third Higher School (Kyoto-Sanko, a junior college), where his roommate was Tadashi Iijima. While a student there in 1920, he was diagnosed with pulmonary tuberculosis.

Early literary career (1924–1928)
In 1924, Kajii entered Tokyo Imperial University, where he studied English literature. Shortly, he planned for publish a literary coterie magazine , with his friends from high school.

In 1925,  was published in Aozora first issue.

During that time, he visited the writer Yasunari Kawabata, whom he befriended. The two writers would play go together several times a week.

Late career and death (1928–1932)
In September 1928, Kajii returned to Osaka, where he spent a period of convalescence at home.

Sensing his impending death, friends including the poet Tatsuji Miyoshi and Ryūzō Yodono decided to publish his first book, a collection of his short stories titled Lemon in 1931.

In 1932, he wrote his first novella, titled . Its publication in Chūōkōron, which had commissioned the work, was Kajii's first in the commercial magazine.

On March 24, 1932, Kajii died of tuberculosis at age 31.

Bibliography

Works available in English translation

Monographs
 The Youth of Things: Life and Death in the Age of Kajii Motojiro (2014) - ed. Stephen Dodd
 Lemon (2009) - trans. Chinatsu Komori and Kenneth Traynor
Anthologies
 "Mating" in The Shōwa Anthology (1984) - eds. Van C. Gessel and Tomone Matsumoto
 "Lemon" in The Oxford Book of Japanese Short Stories (1997) - ed. Theodore W. Goossen
 "Mire" in Tokyo Stories: A Literary Stroll (2002) - ed. Lawrence Rogers
 "Lemon" in The Columbia Anthology of Modern Japanese Literature, Vol. 1 (2005) - eds. J. Thomas Rimer and Van C. Gessel
 "The Lemon," "The Ascension of K, or His Death by Drowning," and "Feelings Atop a Cliff" in Modanizumu; Modernist Fiction from Japan, 1913-1938 - ed. William Jefferson Tyler
 "Scenes of the Mind" in Three-Dimensional Reading: Stories of Time and Space in Japanese Modernist Fiction, 1911-1932 - ed. Angela Yiu
Literary magazines
 "Beneath the Cherry Trees" tr. John Bester in The Japan P.E.N. News (1964)
 "A Musical Derangement" tr. Stephen Wechselblatt in New Orleans Review (1983)
 "The Ascension/Drowning of K" and "Lemon" with introduction "Translating Kajii Motojiro" tr. Alfred Birnbaum in The Literary Review (1996)
 "Under the Cherry Blossoms" tr. Bonnie Huie in The Brooklyn Rail (2014)
Scholarly works
 Kajii Motojiro: An Anthology of Short Stories Translated into English (1977)
 Three Stories of Kajii Motojiro: A Study and Translation (1978)
 The Private World of Kajii Motojiro (1982)
 The Translator as Reader and Writer: English Versions of Japanese Short Fiction by Kajii Motojiro (1982)
Miscellaneous amateur translations on Internet (see external links below).

Translations into other languages 

 French: Le citron (1987, 1996) – partial translation of Remon (stories #1,8,9,10,11,13,16,18)
 Russian: Limon (2004) – full translation of Remon (stories #1–18)

List of works in original Japanese
Stories in magazines
  - May 1923
  - July 1923
  – January 1925
  - February 1925
  - July 1925
   - October 1925
  - November 1925
  - January 1926
  - June 1926
  - July 1926
  - August 1926
  - October 1926
  - February, April 1927
  - March 1928
  – April 1928
  – May 1928
  – May 1928
  – July 1928
  – December 1928
  – June 1930
  – September 1930
  – January 1931
  – January 1932, novella

(Unpublished or unfinished works included in Complete Works are not listed above.)

Books
  – May 1931, collection (stories #1–18)
 -- posthumously --
  – 1934 (ed. Takao Nakatani, Ryūzō Yodono) Rokuhō Shoin
  – 1947 (ed. Ryūzō Yodono) Kyoto: Kōtō Shoin
  – 1948 (ed. Ryūzō Yodono) Kyoto: Kōtō Shoin
  – 1955, selected correspondence. 1955 (ed. Ryūzō Yodono) Kadokawa Shoten
  – 1959 (ed. Ryūzō Yodono, Takao Nakatani) Tokyo: Chikuma Shobō. Reprinted in 1966.
  – 1999-2000 (ed. Sadami Suzuki) Tokyo: Chikuma Shobō

See also

 Japanese literature
 List of Japanese authors

References
Sources consulted

 Kajii, Motojiro (stories); Kodoma de Larroche, Christine (translation, introduction). 1996. Le citron : nouvelles (second partial French translation of Remon). Picquier poche. Arles, France: P. Picquier. : pp. 7–22 (short biography). [First printed as: Kajii, Motojiro (stories); Kodoma de Larroche, Christine (translation, introduction). 1987. Les cercles d'un regard : le monde de Kajii Motojirô (first partial French translation of Remon). Bibliothèque de l'Institut des hautes études japonaises. Paris, France: Maisonneuve et Larose. .]
 Matsuoka, Tatsuya. 2005. "An Encounter with Kajii Motojiro" (English version of his Japanese notice). JLLP (Japanese Literature Publishing Project). Tokyo, Japan: Japanese Literature Publishing and Promotion Center (Agency for Cultural Affairs of Japan). Internet page (snapshot at WebCite).

Endnotes

External links
General reference
 A complete list of stories by Kajii (with literal English and Romaji titles) at Griffe – World's Literature
 J'Lit | Authors : Motojiro Kajii | Books from Japan 
 Matsusaka Castle Ruins, "The scenery which Kajii Motojiro loved" – the basis for "In a Castle Town"
 Audiobook in Japanese  (mp3)
 Motojiro Kajii's grave

Translations available online (includes amateur translations)
 
 
 "An Inner Landscape" (tr. Tony Gonzalez)
 "Beneath the Cherry Trees" (tr. Morgan Giles)
 "Blue Sky" (tr. Morgan Giles)
 "Caress" (tr. Ursula Owen)
 "The Feeling on the Bluff" text and annotated Word format (tr. Ursula Owen)
 "Lemon" plus a comment (tr. C Seu)
 "A Musical Derangement" (tr. Stephen Wechselblatt) in New Orleans Review (Summer/Fall 1983 Issue)
 "Under the Cherry Blossoms" (tr. Bonnie Huie) at The Brooklyn Rail

Reviews
 A short English review of the French partial edition of Remon in Bohème Magazine (July 2004)

Japanese male short story writers
Writers from Osaka
Kyoto University alumni
University of Tokyo alumni
20th-century deaths from tuberculosis
1901 births
1932 deaths
Tuberculosis deaths in Japan